Triphenylamine is an organic compound with formula (C6H5)3N. In contrast to most amines, triphenylamine is nonbasic. At room temperature it appears as a colorless crystalline solid, with monoclinic structure. It is well miscible in diethyl ether and benzene, but it is practically insoluble in water, and partially in ethanol. Its derivatives have useful properties in electrical conductivity and electroluminescence, and they are used in OLEDs as hole-transporters.

Triphenylamine can be prepared by arylation of diphenylamine.

Physical properties 
Triphenylamine has three aromatic groups directly linked to the central nitrogen atom. Each aromatic group acts as an electron attractor, directing the electron cloud of the lone pair of nitrogen towards it. With the delocalization of the nitrogen lone pair, a partial positive charge is conferred to nitrogen, counterbalanced by the partial negative charge localized on the aromatic groups. This arrangement prevents nitrogen protonation, a key mechanism for providing basicity to a solution.

From this characteristic, moreover, it follows that the three N-C bonds all lie on the same plane and that they are located at 120° from each other, which is not the case with aliphatic amines and ammonia, where the orbitals of nitrogen are arranged in a tetrahedron. Due to steric hindrance, the phenyl groups are not on the same plane defined by the three N-C bonds, but are twisted, giving the molecule its characteristic "propeller-like" shape.

See also 
 Triphenylphosphine

References

External links 
 International Chemical Safety Card 1366
 SDS sheet at www.sigmaaldrich.com
 CDC - NIOSH Pocket Guide to Chemical Hazards
Spectroscopy of triphenylamine (gas phase neutral, radical cation, protonated)

Tertiary amines
Phenyl compounds